Al-Kafrun (also spelled Kafroun) is a Syrian village in the Tartous Governorate. According to the Syria Central Bureau of Statistics (CBS), al-Kafrun had a population of 485 in the 2004 census. Its inhabitants are predominantly Greek Orthodox Christians.

It is well known in the area for the annual festival in celebration of the Assumption/Dormition of Mary on 15 August, held atop the Jabal al-Saideh mountain. Al-Kafrun is the birthplace of the famous Syrian singer George Wassouf.

References

External links
Town website in Arabic

Populated places in Safita District
Eastern Orthodox Christian communities in Syria